Berthold I (died 7 March 1180) was Count of Tyrol from about 1165 until his death.

He was a younger son of Count Albert II and his wife, Adelaide of Diessen-Andechs. The Tyrolean counts were able to strengthen their autonomy from Bavaria after the Welf duke Henry the Proud was deposed by King Conrad III of Germany in 1139. About 1165, Berthold succeeded his elder brother Albert III as sole Count of Tyrol.

Berthold I was married to his cousin Agnes (1149–1207), a daughter of Otto I of Ortenburg, who was himself a son of Count Albert I of Tyrol. Upon his death, he was succeeded by his sons Berthold II and Henry I,

References

12th-century births
Year of birth unknown
1180 deaths
Counts of Tyrol
12th-century people of the Holy Roman Empire